Massachusetts held its elections November 7, 1814.  State law required a majority vote for election, which was not met in two districts, leading to a second election January 6, 1815.

See also 
 Massachusetts's 4th congressional district special election, 1814
 Massachusetts's 12th congressional district special election, 1814
 Massachusetts's 3rd congressional district special election, 1815
 United States House of Representatives elections, 1814 and 1815
 List of United States representatives from Massachusetts

Notes 

1814
United States House of Representatives
Massachusetts
United States House of Representatives